Suzanne Lenglen and Elizabeth Ryan successfully defended their title, defeating Dorothea Lambert Chambers and Ethel Larcombe in the final, 6–4, 6–0 to win the ladies' doubles tennis title at the 1920 Wimbledon Championships.

Draw

Finals

Top half

The nationalities of Mrs DC Bousfield and Miss Cane are unknown.

Bottom half

The nationality of Miss Collings is unknown.

References

External links

Women's Doubles
Wimbledon Championship by year – Women's doubles
Wimbledon Championships - Doubles
Wimbledon Championships - Doubles